U7 snRNA-associated Sm-like protein LSm10 is a protein that in humans is encoded by the LSM10 gene.

Interactions 

LSM10 has been shown to interact with LSM3.

See also 
U7 small nuclear RNA

References

Further reading